This is an incomplete list of works by William Jackson Hooker  (6 July 178512 August 1865), an English botanist and botanical illustrator, who became the first director of Kew when in 1831 it was recommended to be placed under state ownership as a botanic garden. At Kew he founded the Herbarium and enlarged the gardens and arboretum,

Illustrations in other works
1808. Turner, Dawson, Fuci, sive, Plantarum Fucorum generi a botanicis ascriptarum icones descriptiones et historia (Historia fucorum) (4 volumes)

Works

Books

1813.  Journal of a Tour in Iceland in the Summer of 1809 (2 volumes)
1816. British jungermanniae: being a history and description, with colored figures, of each species of the genus, and microscopical analyses of the parts
1818. Musci exotici: containing figures and descriptions of new or little known foreign mosses and other cryptoganic subjects
1818. Muscologia Britannica; containing the mosses of Great Britain & Ireland
1823-7. Exotic Flora, indicating such of the specimens as are deserving cultivation (3 volumes)
1825. Catalogue of Plants in the Glasgow Botanic Garden
1826. 'Botanical Appendix' in Parry, William Edward, Journal of a third voyage for the discovery of a north-west passage from the Atlantic to the Pacific: performed in the years 1824-25, in His Majesty's ships, Hecla and Fury, under the orders of Captain William E. Parry, R.N., F.R.S., and commander of the expedition
1831. IIcones filicum (IIcones filicum ad eas potissimum species illustrandas destinata, qua hactenus, vel in herbariis delituerunt prorsus incognitae, vel saltem nondum per icones botanicis innotuerunt. Figures and descriptions of ferns, principally of such as have been altogether unnoticed by botanists, or as have not yet been correctly figure), in concert with Dr R. K. Greville (2 volumes)
1833, 1838. The British Flora (2 volumes)
1830–1842. The Journal of Botany (4 volumes)
1835, 1836. Companion to the Botanical Magazine (2 volumes)
1837–54. Icones Plantarum (10 volumes)
1840. Flora Boreali-Americana, or the Botany of the Northern Parts of British America '(2 volumes)
1841. The Botany of Captain Beechey's voyage
1842. Genera filicum, or, Illustrations of the ferns, and other allied genera 
1842–1848. The London Journal of Botany (7 volumes) 
1846–1864. Species Filicum: Volume 1 (1858); Volume 2 (1858); Volume 3 (1858); Volume 4 (1846); Volume 5 (1858)
1847. Kew Gardens; or, a popular guide to the Royal Botanic Gardens of Kew"
1847. Description of Victoria regia, or, Great water-lily of South America1849. A Century of Orchidaceous Plants1849–1857. Hooker's Journal of Botany and Kew Garden Miscellany (9 volumes)
1849. Niger Flora1854. A Century of Ferns1859. Filices Exoticae, or Coloured Figures and Descriptions of Exotic Ferns1861. The British Ferns1864. A Second Century of FernsArticles
1824. Some Account of a Collection of Arctic Plants formed by Edward Sabine, Esq., F.R.S. and L.S., Captain in the Royal Artillery, during a Voyage in the Polar Seas in the Year 18231827–65. Curtis's Botanical Magazine'' (38 volumes)

External links
 Details of the books, articles, etc. written by William Jackson Hooker from the Biodiversity Heritage Library

References

Bibliographies by writer